Frederick Clark Roberts (born August 14, 1960) is an American former basketball player who played power forward in the National Basketball Association (NBA) for 13 seasons, a career spanning from 1983 to 1997, becoming a successful journeymen in the league. He also played in FC Barcelona of the Liga ACB.

College career
Roberts played four years of college basketball at Brigham Young University (BYU) in Utah, from 1978 to 1982. He played in 119 total games, averaged 15.5 points and seven rebounds and shot 54.6% from the field. His playing ability along with Danny Ainge and Greg Kite led to the success of the BYU program during this time. Roberts also played on the USA Junior World Championship Team in 1979, playing alongside greats such as James Worthy and leading the US to an undefeated 8-0 record.

College Statistics

|-
| align="left" | 1978–79
| align="left" | BYU
| 28 || - || 30.8 || .543 || - || .783 || 6.8 || 2.3 || 0.9 || 0.8 || 14.3
|-
| align="left" | 1979–80
| align="left" | BYU
| 29 || - || 30.7 || .588 || - || .724 || 6.1 || 2.5 || 0.3 || 0.7 || 12.9
|-
| align="left" | 1980-81
| align="left" | BYU
| 32 || - || 37.1 || .579 || - || .777 || 8.0 || 3.4 || 0.8 || 0.4 || 18.8
|-
| align="left" | 1981–82
| align="left" | BYU
| 30 || - || 37.3 || .479 || - || .798 || 7.2 || 3.2 || 0.7 || 0.6 || 15.5
|- class="sortbottom"
| style="text-align:center;" colspan="2"| Career
| 119 || - || 34.1 || .546 || - || .776 || 7.0 || 2.9 || 0.7 || 0.6 || 15.5
|}

Professional career
He was drafted by the Milwaukee Bucks in the second round of the 1982 NBA draft, but opted to play basketball for a year in Bologna, Italy. While overseas, Roberts was traded to the New Jersey Nets on November 12, 1982 for Phil Ford and a second-round draft choice, and from there was traded to the San Antonio Spurs on June 7, 1983 with other players in exchange for coach Stan Albeck. Afterwards, he played his first full NBA season with the Spurs.

He played just over a season with San Antonio before being traded to the Utah Jazz for two second-round draft picks. In September 1986, the Boston Celtics offered him a two-year deal worth $315,000, which the Jazz matched. Almost immediately after matching the offer, the Jazz traded him to Boston for a future draft pick. He played two seasons for the Celtics, appearing in the 1987 NBA Finals, before being chosen by the Miami Heat in the 1988 NBA expansion draft.

However, Roberts was traded to the Milwaukee Bucks before ever playing a game for the Heat. He played for the Bucks for five seasons, where he had his best years as a professional, reaching the 10 points per game mark and playing more minutes than he ever had in his career.  The highlight of his time in Milwaukee came in Game 4 of the Eastern Conference semi-finals in 1989, in which Roberts replaced injured forward Terry Cummings and scored a career-high 33 points in a 96-94 loss to the Detroit Pistons.  The performance was especially impressive considering it came against Dennis Rodman, one of the best defenders in the league.  The tough, defense-minded Pistons would eventually win the NBA championship later that season.  Roberts was released by the Bucks when his contract expired after the 1992-93 NBA season.

After not renewing with the Bucks in 1993, he signed with FC Barcelona of the Spanish Liga ACB, where in his only season he managed to win the Spanish Cup, defeating Taugrés Baskonia in the final. For the season he averaged 14.8 points and 5.8 rebounds per game.

After his second stint in Europe, he played for the Chicago Rockers of the Continental Basketball Association. He then signed a 10-day contract with the Cleveland Cavaliers, and was immediately put to work due to starting power forward Tyrone Hill going down with an ankle injury. Once Hill returned though, Roberts stopped seeing playing time, but considered his stint with the Cavs as a stepping stone.

He then signed with the Los Angeles Lakers for the 1995-96 season, playing only 33 games. Coinciding with Magic Johnson's "comeback" year, Roberts became the only player in NBA history to be a teammate of both Johnson and Larry Bird.  The following year, he signed a one-year contract with the Dallas Mavericks, but was released almost immediately after Don Nelson became General Manager.

NBA Career Statistics

Regular Season

|-
| align="left" | 1983–84
| align="left" | San Antonio
| 79 || 8 || 19.4 || .536 || .250 || .837 || 3.8 || 1.2 || 0.7 || 0.5 || 7.3
|-
| align="left" | 1984–85
| align="left" | San Antonio
| 22 || 0 || 13.9 || .449 || .000 || .763 || 1.6 || 1.0 || 0.5 || 0.5 || 5.3
|-
| align="left" | 1984–85
| align="left" | Utah
| 52 || 0 || 16.8 || .513 || 1.000 || .840 || 2.9 || 1.3 || 0.3 || 0.2 || 8.7
|-
| align="left" | 1985–86
| align="left" | Utah
| 58 || 0 || 8.1 || .443 || .500 || .770 || 1.4 || 0.5 || 0.1 || 0.1 || 3.7
|-
| align="left" | 1986–87
| align="left" | Boston
| 73 || 11 || 14.8 || .515 || .000 || .810 || 2.6 || 0.8 || 0.3 || 0.3 || 5.5
|-
| align="left" | 1987–88
| align="left" | Boston
| 74 || 14 || 13.9 || .488 || .000 || .776 || 2.2 || 1.1 || 0.2 || 0.2 || 6.1
|-
| align="left" | 1988–89
| align="left" | Milwaukee
| 71 || 3 || 17.6 || .486 || .214 || .806 || 2.9 || 0.9 || 0.5 || 0.3 || 5.9
|-
| align="left" | 1989–90
| align="left" | Milwaukee
| style="background:#cfecec;"| 82* || 66 || 27.3 || .495 || .182 || .783 || 3.8 || 1.8 || 0.7 || 0.3 || 10.5
|-
| align="left" | 1990–91
| align="left" | Milwaukee
| style="background:#cfecec;"| 82* || 82 || 25.8 || .533 || .160 || .813 || 3.4 || 1.6 || 0.8 || 0.4 || 10.8
|-
| align="left" | 1991–92
| align="left" | Milwaukee
| 80 || 63 || 21.8 || .482 || .514 || .749 || 3.2 || 1.5 || 0.7 || 0.5 || 9.6
|-
| align="left" | 1992–93
| align="left" | Milwaukee
| 79 || 5 || 18.8 || .528 || .414 || .799 || 3.0 || 1.5 || 0.7 || 0.3 || 7.6
|-
| align="left" | 1994–95
| align="left" | Cleveland
| 21 || 0 || 10.6 || .389 || .364 || .769 || 1.6 || 0.4 || 0.3 || 0.1 || 3.8
|-
| align="left" | 1995–96
| align="left" | Los Angeles
| 33 || 1 || 9.6 || .495 || .286 || .786 || 1.4 || 0.8 || 0.5 || 0.1 || 3.7
|-
| align="left" | 1996–97
| align="left" | Dallas
| 12 || 0 || 3.3 || .400 || .000 || .714 || 0.8 || 0.0 || 0.0 || 0.1 || 1.8
|- class="sortbottom"
| style="text-align:center;" colspan="2"| Career
| 818 || 253 || 18.0 || .502 || .325 || .796 || 2.8 || 1.2 || 0.5 || 0.3 || 7.3
|}

Playoffs

|-
| align="left" | 1984–85
| align="left" | Utah
| 10 || 0 || 13.0 || .442 || .000 || .800 || 1.7 || 0.9 || 0.7 || 0.3 || 5.4
|-
| align="left" | 1985–86
| align="left" | Utah
| 4 || 0 || 7.8 || .467 || .000 || .889 || 1.8 || 0.8 || 0.0 || 0.0 || 5.5
|-
| align="left" | 1986–87
| align="left" | Boston
| 20 || 4 || 13.3 || .508 || .000 || .705 || 1.7 || 0.6 || 0.3 || 0.2 || 4.6
|-
| align="left" | 1987–88
| align="left" | Boston
| 15 || 0 || 6.7 || .524 || .000 || .636 || 1.1 || 0.2 || 0.2 || 0.0 || 1.9
|-
| align="left" | 1988–89
| align="left" | Milwaukee
| 9 || 5 || 38.3 || .490 || .000 || .850 || 4.3 || 2.2 || 0.6 || 0.4 || 14.7
|-
| align="left" | 1989–90
| align="left" | Milwaukee
| 4 || 4 || 19.8 || .650 || .000 || .813 || 2.0 || 0.8 || 0.0 || 0.3 || 9.8
|-
| align="left" | 1990–91
| align="left" | Milwaukee
| 3 || 3 || 34.3 || .457 || .000 || 1.000 || 5.0 || 2.3 || 0.7 || 0.3 || 11.3
|-
| align="left" | 1994–95
| align="left" | Cleveland
| 1 || 0 || 7.0 || .750 || .000 || .000 || 2.0 || 0.0 || 0.0 || 0.0 || 6.0
|-
| align="left" | 1995–96
| align="left" | Los Angeles
| 1 || 0 || 3.0 || .000 || .000 || .000 || 3.0 || 0.0 || 0.0 || 0.0 || 0.0
|- class="sortbottom"
| style="text-align:center;" colspan="2"| Career
| 67 || 16 || 15.9 || .495 || .000 || .771 || 2.1 || 0.9 || 0.3 || 0.2 || 6.1
|}

Later work
After his basketball career, Roberts became an educator in Utah. He worked as a principal for five years, then began teaching sixth grade in 2007.

References

External links
Fred Roberts' BYU and NBA statistics at Databasebasketball
Milwaukee Bucks Media Guide 2010-11

1960 births
Living people
American expatriate basketball people in Italy
American expatriate basketball people in Spain
American men's basketball players
American school administrators
Basketball players from Utah
Boston Celtics players
BYU Cougars men's basketball players
Centers (basketball)
Chicago Rockers players
Cleveland Cavaliers players
Dallas Mavericks players
FC Barcelona Bàsquet players
Fortitudo Pallacanestro Bologna players
Liga ACB players
Los Angeles Lakers players
Miami Heat expansion draft picks
Milwaukee Bucks draft picks
Milwaukee Bucks players
Parade High School All-Americans (boys' basketball)
Power forwards (basketball)
San Antonio Spurs players
Sportspeople from Provo, Utah
Utah Jazz players